Ruchi Ghanashyam (born 4 April 1960) is an Indian diplomat who belongs to the Indian Foreign Service.

Personal life
Ruchi Ghanashyam holds a Master of Arts degree in psychology from Bhopal University. She is married to Ajjampur Rangaiah Ghanashyam, who also belonged to the Indian Foreign Service. They have two sons.

Career
She joined the Indian Foreign Service in August 1982. She was the Third Secretary at the Indian Embassy in Damascus where she learnt Arabic. She has served in Indian missions in Brussels, Kathmandu, Damascus, Islamabad Pretoria and Accra. Ruchi has served at the Ministry of External Affairs in New Delhi as Director (Pakistan) from August 2000 to March 2004. Prior to this, she was the Counsellor (Political, Press & Information) at the Indian High Commission in Pakistan. As an Undersecretary at the Ministry of External Affairs in New Delhi, she handled the Audio-Visual Publicity for the Ministry.

Ghanashyam was the first Indian woman diplomat to be posted in Islamabad when the harassment of Indian diplomats was routine.

See also
 A. Gitesh Sarma
 Vijay Gokhale
 Harsh V Shringla
Taranjit Singh Sandhu
 Syed Akbaruddin

References 

Living people
Indian Foreign Service officers
Indian women ambassadors
1960 births
Ambassadors of India to South Africa
Barkatullah University alumni
High Commissioners of India to the United Kingdom